Kevin Rees Barnett (born May 14, 1974) is an American former volleyball player. He played for the United States national team at the 2000 and 2004 Summer Olympics.  Barnett  worked as a broadcaster for the Pac-12 Networks and FOX Sports West in Los Angeles, as well as teaming with Paul Sunderland for indoor volleyball during the Olympics.

References

1974 births
Living people
Olympic volleyball players of the United States
Volleyball players at the 2000 Summer Olympics
Volleyball players at the 2004 Summer Olympics
Sportspeople from Naperville, Illinois
American men's volleyball players